An ancestor, also known as a forefather, fore-elder, or a forebear, is a parent or (recursively) the parent of an antecedent (i.e., a grandparent, great-grandparent, great-great-grandparent and so forth). Ancestor is "any person from whom one is descended. In law, the person from whom an estate has been inherited."

Two individuals have a genetic relationship if one is the ancestor of the other or if they share a common ancestor. In evolutionary theory, species which share an evolutionary ancestor are said to be of common descent. However, this concept of ancestry does not apply to some bacteria and other organisms capable of horizontal gene transfer. Some research suggests that the average person has twice as many female ancestors as male ancestors. This might have been due to the past prevalence of polygynous relations and female hypergamy.

Assuming that all of an individual's ancestors are otherwise unrelated to each other, that individual has 2n ancestors in the nth generation before her/him and a total of 2g+1 − 2 ancestors in the g generations before him/her.  In practice, however, it is clear that most ancestors of humans (and any other species) are multiply related (see pedigree collapse). Consider n = 40: the human species is more than 40 generations old, yet the number 240, approximately 1012 or one trillion, dwarfs the number of humans who have ever lived.

Some cultures confer reverence to ancestors, both living and dead; in contrast, some more youth-oriented cultural contexts display less veneration of elders. In other cultural contexts, some people seek providence from their deceased ancestors; this practice is sometimes known as ancestor worship or, more accurately, ancestor veneration.

See also

 Archaic humans
 Collateral descendant
 Consanguinity
 DNA
 Mitochondrial DNA
 Y chromosome
 Ethnic group
 Family
 Genealogy
 Genetic genealogy
 Kinship
 Lineage (anthropology)
 Lineal descendant
 Most recent common ancestor
 Progenitor

Citations

External links

 United States Census Bureau

Kinship and descent